Sands Casino typically refers to the Sands Hotel on the Las Vegas Strip.

Sands Casino may also refer to:
Marina Bay Sands – Singapore
Sands Atlantic City – Atlantic City, New Jersey, United States
Sands Casino Resort Bethlehem – Bethlehem, Pennsylvania, United States (now Wind Creek Bethlehem)
Sands Macao – Macau, China
Sands Regency – Reno, Nevada
Sands San Juan (now InterContinental San Juan Resort & Casino) – San Juan, Puerto Rico